Atul Dodiya (born 20 January 1959, in Ghatkopar, Mumbai, India) is an Indian artist.

Biography
Atul began exhibiting and selling his work in the early 1980s following his graduation from Sir J. J. School of Art in Mumbai where he received a Bachelor of Fine Arts degree.  He furthered his academic training at the École des Beaux-Arts in Paris from 1991 to 1992 subsequent to a scholarship awarded by the French Government.

Atul has had several solo shows in India and exhibited at 'Reflections and Images' Vadehra Art Gallery, New Delhi and Mumbai, 1993 and 'Trends and Images' CIMA, Calcutta, 1993. Outside India, he has exhibited at Gallery Lund, Amsterdam in 1993, participated in 'The Richness of the Spirit' Kuwait and Rome in 1986–89, 'India - Contemporary Art' World Trade Center, Amsterdam 1989, 'Exposition Collective' Cite Internationale Des Arts, Paris 1992. Atul Dodiya represented as one of the artists at India Pavilion, Venice Biennale 2019, showcasing an installation titled "Broken Branches" made in 2002 inspired by the philosophy of Mahatma Gandhi. He was given the Sanskriti Award, New Delhi in 1995. A recent painting, an oil and acrylic work on canvas dedicated to former Team India captain Rahul Dravid named "The Wall" fetched Rs 57.6  lakh in auction .

Atul Dodiya is married to fellow painter Anju Dodiya and lives and works in Mumbai.

Solo exhibitions 
2010 Malevich Matters and Other Shutters, Vadehra Art Gallery, New Delhi
2008 Pale Ancestors, Bodhi Art, Mumbai
2007 Vadehra Art Gallery, New Delhi Museum Gallery, Mumbai Chemould Prescott, Mumbai
2006 Sumukha Gallery, Bangalore Singapore; Tyler Print Institute, Singapore; Bodhi Art, New Delhi, Mumbai, New York
2005 Faculty of Fine Arts, Vadodara; Bose Pacia, New York
2004 Faculty of Fine Arts, Vadodara
2003 Bose Pacia, New York
2002 Walsh Gallery, Chicago; Sakshi Gallery, Bombay; Reina Sofia Museum, Madrid
2001 The Fine Art Resource, Berlin; The Japan Foundation Asia Center, Tokyo; Gallery Chemould, Bombay
1999 Vadehra Art Gallery, New Delhi; Gallery Chemould, Bombay
1997 Cima Gallery, Calcutta
1989 91, 95,97, Gallery Chemould, Bombay

Awards 
2008 - Raza Award, Raza Foundation
1999 - Civitella Ranieri Foundation Fellowship, Italy
1999 - Sotheby's Prize
1995 - Sanskriti Award
1982 - Government of Maharashtra Gold Medal

References

External links 
"Atul Dodiya Profile and Collection of Art Works"
Atul Dodiya at Gallery Nature Morte
Works by Atul Dodiya
Atul Dodiya on Culturebase.net
Edge of Desire: Recent Art in India (exhibition 2007), National Gallery of Modern Art - includes the triptych Tomb's Day (2001)
Tryst with mythic structures, The Hindu, Mar 03, 2006

Indian male painters
1959 births
Living people
Sir Jamsetjee Jeejebhoy School of Art alumni
Artists from Mumbai
École des Beaux-Arts alumni
20th-century Indian painters
21st-century Indian painters
Painters from Maharashtra
20th-century Indian male artists
21st-century Indian male artists